The Accounting Principles Board (APB) is the former authoritative body of the American Institute of Certified Public Accountants (AICPA). It was created by the American Institute of Certified Public Accountants in 1959 and issued pronouncements on accounting principles until 1973, when it was replaced by the Financial Accounting Standards Board (FASB).

The APB was disbanded in the hopes that the smaller, fully independent FASB could more effectively create accounting standards. The APB and the related Securities Exchange Commission were unable to operate completely independently of the U.S. government. According to the SEC, "the overall record of the APB was a reasonably good one, but it seems likely that a smaller full-time body directly in control of its research holds promise of more success".  Among others, Abraham Briloff was critical of some actions of the Accounting Principles Board.  In response to APB 17, Briloff referred to the APB as the "Accounting Pragmatics Board".

Of the 31 APB opinions and 4 statements, several were instrumental in improving the theory and practice of significant areas of accounting. Many have been superseded by FASB pronouncements; 19 opinions still stand as part of generally accepted accounting principles:

Notes

Accounting organizations
Accounting in the United States
Organizations established in 1959